"Tiger" Ted Lowry (October 27, 1919 – June 14, 2010) was an American journeyman boxer.

Boxing career 
Ted Lowry's career started out strong, with 8 successful fights (7 wins, 1 draw), before losing to Sam Shumway, whom he had previously beaten, and would defeat again in their next fight. Afterwards, he fought regularly, winning some and losing some. He twice faced future heavyweight champion Rocky Marciano, going the distance on both occasions. In doing so he became one of only three fighters to avoid being knocked out by Marciano. Many observers claim he won the first fight vs Marciano, however upon closer examination, if it was not for the home crowd the fight could have been drawn. Rocky lost first 4 rounds but on the basis of his aggressiveness and constant punching in the later rounds, Marciano won a unanimous decision from the judges. Rocky Marciano also drew the fight with undefeated Roland La Starza (37-0) but because of supplemental points used by New York and Pennsylvania Rocky won.
Lowry retired from boxing in 1955. Overall, he compiled a record of 70 wins, 68 losses, and 10 draws, 46 wins by way of knockout.

Whilst serving in the armed forces, Lowry fought an exhibition against Heavyweight Champion Joe Louis.

Honors
Lowry was a member of the all-black 555th Parachute Battalion and was honored by United States presidents for his World War II service.

References

External links

1910 births
2010 deaths
Boxers from Connecticut
People from New Bedford, Massachusetts
Sportspeople from New Haven, Connecticut
American male boxers
Heavyweight boxers